Several ships of the British Royal Navy have been named HMS Puncher.

  - an escort carrier of the Second World War, crewed by the Royal Canadian Navy
  - tank landing ship launched 1946 as LST 3036 and renamed Puncher 1947; sold and scrapped 1961
  - a fast patrol boat

Royal Navy ship names